A mantra (Pali: manta) or mantram (Devanagari: मन्त्रम्) is a sacred utterance, a numinous sound, a syllable, word or phonemes, or group of words in Sanskrit, Pali and other languages believed by practitioners to have religious, magical or spiritual powers. Some mantras have a syntactic structure and literal meaning, while others do not.

The earliest mantras were composed in Vedic Sanskrit in India. At its simplest, the word ॐ (Aum, Om) serves as a mantra, it is believed to be the first sound which was originated on earth. Aum sound when produced creates a reverberation in the body which helps the body and mind to be calm. In more sophisticated forms, mantras are melodic phrases with spiritual interpretations such as a human longing for truth, reality, light, immortality, peace, love, knowledge, and action. Some mantras without literal meaning are musically uplifting and spiritually meaningful.

The use, structure, function, importance, and types of mantras vary according to the school and philosophy of Hinduism, Buddhism, Jainism, and Sikhism. In Japanese Shingon tradition, the word Shingon means mantra.

Mantras serve a central role in tantra. In this school, mantras are considered to be a sacred formula and a deeply personal ritual, effective only after initiation. In other schools of Hinduism, Buddhism, Jainism or Sikhism, initiation is not a requirement.

The word mantra is also used in English to refer to something that is said frequently and is deliberately repeated over and over and thus possibly becomes boring by dint of too much repetition.

Etymology and origins

The Sanskrit word  is derived from the root man- "to think".

Scholars consider the use of mantras to have begun before 1000 BC. By the middle Vedic period (1000 BC to 500 BC) – claims Frits Staal – mantras in Hinduism had developed into a blend of art and science.

According to Alex Wayman and Ryujun Tajima, "Zhenyan" (or "Shingon") means "true speech", has the sense of "an exact mantra which reveals the truth of the dharmas", and is the path of mantras.

According to Bernfried Schlerath, the concept of sātyas mantras is found in Indo-Iranian Yasna 31.6 and the Rigveda, where it is considered structured thought in conformity with the reality or poetic (religious) formulas associated with inherent fulfillment.

Definition

There is no generally accepted definition of mantra.

Renou has defined mantra as a thought. Mantras are structured formulae of thoughts, claims Silburn. Farquhar concludes that mantras are a religious thought, prayer, sacred utterance, but also believed to be a spell or weapon of supernatural power. Zimmer defines mantra as a verbal instrument to produce something in one's mind. Bharati defines mantra, in the context of the Tantric school of Hinduism, to be a combination of mixed genuine and quasi-morphemes arranged in conventional patterns, based on codified esoteric traditions, passed on from a guru to a disciple through prescribed initiation.

Jan Gonda, a widely cited scholar on Indian mantras, defines mantra as general name for the verses, formulas or sequence of words in prose which contain praise, are believed to have religious, magical or spiritual efficiency, which are meditated upon, recited, muttered or sung in a ritual, and which are collected in the methodically arranged ancient texts of Hinduism. There is no universally applicable uniform definition of mantra because mantras are used in different religions, and within each religion in different schools of philosophy. In some schools of Hinduism for example, suggests Gonda, a mantra is sakti (power) to the devotee in the form of formulated and expressed thought. Staal clarifies that mantras are not rituals, they are what is recited or chanted during a ritual.

In Oxford Living Dictionary mantra is defined as a word or sound repeated to aid concentration in meditation. Cambridge Dictionary provides two different definitions. The first refers to Hinduism and Buddhism: a word or sound that is believed to have a special spiritual power. The second definition is more general: a word or phrase that is often repeated and expresses a particularly strong belief. For instance, a football team can choose individual words as their own "mantra."

There is a long history of scholarly disagreement on the meaning of mantras and whether they are instruments of mind, as implied by the etymological origin of the word mantra. One school suggests mantras are mostly meaningless sound constructs, while the other holds them to be mostly meaningful linguistic instruments of mind. Both schools agree that mantras have melody and a well designed mathematical precision in their construction and that their influence on the reciter and listener is similar to that is observed in people around the world listening to their beloved music that is devoid of words.

Staal presents a non-linguistic view of mantras. He suggests that verse mantras are metered and harmonized to mathematical precision (for example, in the viharanam technique), which resonate, but a lot of them are a hodgepodge of meaningless constructs such as are found in folk music around the world. Staal cautions that there are many mantras that can be translated and do have spiritual meaning and philosophical themes central to Hinduism, but that does not mean all mantras have a literal meaning. He further notes that even when mantras do not have a literal meaning, they do set a tone and ambiance in the ritual as they are recited, and thus have a straightforward and uncontroversial ritualistic meaning. The sounds may lack literal meaning, but they can have an effect. He compares mantras to bird songs, that have the power to communicate, yet do not have a literal meaning. On that saman category of Hindu mantras, which Staal described as resembling the arias of Bach's oratorios and other European classics, he notes that these mantras have musical structure, but they almost always are completely different from anything in the syntax of natural languages. Mantras are literally meaningless, yet musically meaningful to Staal. The saman chant mantras were transmitted from one Hindu generation to next verbally for over 1000 years but never written, a feat, suggests Staal, that was made possible by the strict mathematical principles used in constructing the mantras. These saman chant mantras are also mostly meaningless, cannot be literally translated as Sanskrit or any Indian language, but nevertheless are beautiful in their resonant themes, variations, inversions, and distribution. They draw the devotee in. Staal is not the first person to view Hindu mantras in this manner. The ancient Hindu Vedic ritualist Kautsa was one of the earliest scholars to note that mantras are meaningless; their function is phonetic and syntactic, not semantic.

Harvey Alper and others present mantras from the linguistic point view. They admit Staal's observation that many mantras do contain bits and pieces of meaningless jargon, but they question what language or text doesn't. The presence of an abracadabra bit does not necessarily imply the entire work is meaningless. Alper lists numerous mantras that have philosophical themes, moral principles, a call to virtuous life, and even mundane petitions. He suggests that from a set of millions of mantras, the devotee chooses some mantras voluntarily, thus expressing that speaker's intention, and the audience for that mantra is that speaker's chosen spiritual entity. Mantras deploy the language of spiritual expression, they are religious instruments, and that is what matters to the devotee. A mantra creates a feeling in the practicing person. It has an emotive numinous effect, it mesmerizes, it defies expression, and it creates sensations that are by definition private and at the heart of all religions and spiritual phenomena.

Hinduism

History
According to Indologist Frits Staal, during the early Vedic period, Vedic poets became fascinated by the inspirational power of poems, metered verses, and music. They referred to them with the root dhi-, which evolved into the dhyana (meditation) of Hinduism, and the language used to start and assist this process manifested as a mantra. By the middle vedic period (1000 BC to 500 BC), mantras were derived from all vedic compositions. They included ṛc (verses from Rigveda for example), sāman (musical chants from the Sāmaveda for example), yajus (a muttered formula from the yajurveda for example), and nigada (a loudly spoken yajus). During the Hindu Epics period and after, mantras multiplied in many ways and diversified to meet the needs and passions of various schools of Hinduism. In the Linga Purana, Mantra is listed as one of the 1,008 names of Lord Shiva.

Numerous ancient mantras are found in the Saṃhitā portion of the Vedas. The Saṃhitās are the most ancient layer of the Vedas, and contain numerous mantras, hymns, prayers, and litanies. The Rigveda Samhita contains about 10552 Mantras, classified into ten books called Mandalas. A Sukta is a group of Mantras. Mantras come in many forms, including ṛc (verses from the Rigveda for example) and sāman (musical chants from the Sāmaveda for example). 

According to Hindu tradition, the Vedas are sacred scriptures which were revealed (and not composed) by the seers (Rishis). According to the ancient commentator and linguist, Yaska, these ancient sacred revelations were then passed down through an oral tradition and are considered to be the foundation for the Hindu tradition.

Mantras took a center stage in Tantric traditions, which made extensive ritual and meditative use of mantras, and posited that each mantra is a deity in sonic form.

Function and structure
One function of mantras is to solemnize and ratify rituals. Each mantra, in Vedic rituals, is coupled with an act. According to Apastamba Srauta Sutra, each ritual act is accompanied by one mantra, unless the Sutra explicitly marks that one act corresponds to several mantras. According to Gonda, and others, there is a connection and rationale between a Vedic mantra and each Vedic ritual act that accompanies it. In these cases, the function of mantras was to be an instrument of ritual efficacy for the priest, and a tool of instruction for a ritual act for others.

Over time, as the Puranas and Epics were composed, the concepts of worship, virtues and spirituality evolved in Hinduism and new schools of Hinduism were founded, each continuing to develop and refine its own mantras. In Hinduism, suggests Alper, the function of mantras shifted from the quotidian to redemptive. In other words, in Vedic times, mantras were recited a practical, quotidian goal as intention, such as requesting a deity's help in the discovery of lost cattle, cure of illness, succeeding in competitive sport or journey away from home. The literal translation of Vedic mantras suggests that the function of mantra, in these cases, was to cope with the uncertainties and dilemmas of daily life. In a later period of Hinduism, mantras were recited with a transcendental redemptive goal as intention, such as escape from the cycle of life and rebirth, forgiveness for bad karma, and experiencing a spiritual connection with the god. The function of mantras, in these cases, was to cope with the human condition as a whole. According to Alper, redemptive spiritual mantras opened the door for mantras where every part need not have a literal meaning, but together their resonance and musical quality assisted the transcendental spiritual process. Overall, explains Alper, using Śivasūtra mantras as an example, Hindu mantras have philosophical themes and are metaphorical with social dimension and meaning; in other words, they are a spiritual language and instrument of thought.

According to Staal, Hindu mantras may be spoken aloud, anirukta (not enunciated), upamsu (inaudible), or manasa (not spoken, but recited in the mind). In ritual use, mantras are often silent instruments of meditation.

Invocation
For almost every mantra, there are six limbs called Shadanga. These six limbs are: Seer (Rishi), Deity (Devata), Seed (Beeja), Energy (Shakti), Poetic Meter (chanda), and Kilaka (Lock).

Methods

The most basic mantra is Om, which in Hinduism is known as the "pranava mantra," the source of all mantras. The Hindu philosophy behind this is the premise that before existence and beyond existence is only One reality, Brahman, and the first manifestation of Brahman expressed as Om. For this reason, Om is considered as a foundational idea and reminder, and thus is prefixed and suffixed to all Hindu prayers. While some mantras may invoke individual gods or principles, fundamental mantras, like the 'Shanti Mantra, the 'Gayatri Mantra' and others all ultimately focus on the One reality.

Tantric

In the Tantric school the universe is sound. The supreme (para) brings forth existence through the Word (Shabda). Creation consists of vibrations at various frequencies and amplitudes giving rise to the phenomena of the world.

Buhnemann notes that deity mantras are an essential part of Tantric compendia. The tantric mantras vary in their structure and length. Mala mantras are those mantras which have an enormous number of syllables. In contrast, bija mantras are one-syllabled, typically ending in anusvara (a simple nasal sound).  These are derived from the name of a deity; for example, Durga yields dum and Ganesha yields gam. Bija mantras are prefixed and appended to other mantras, thereby creating complex mantras. In the tantric school, these mantras are believed to have supernatural powers, and they are transmitted by a preceptor to a disciple in an initiation ritual. Tantric mantras found a significant audience and adaptations in medieval India, Southeast Asia and numerous other Asian countries with Buddhism.

Majumdar and other scholars suggest mantras are central to the Tantric school, with numerous functions. From initiating and emancipating a tantric devotee to worshiping manifested forms of the divine. From enabling heightened sexual energy in the male and the female to acquiring supernormal psychological and spiritual power. From preventing evil influences to exorcizing demons, and many others. These claimed functions and other aspects of the tantric mantra are a subject of controversy among scholars.

Tantra usage is not unique to Hinduism: it is also found in Buddhism both inside and outside India.

Japa

Mantra japa is a practice of repetitively uttering the same mantra for an auspicious number of times, the most popular being 108, and sometimes just 5, 10, 28 or 1008. Japa is found in personal prayer or meditative efforts of some Hindus, as well during formal puja (group prayers).  Japa is assisted by malas (bead necklaces) containing 108 beads and a head bead (sometimes referred to as the 'meru', or 'guru' bead); the devotee using his/her fingers to count each bead as he/she repeats the chosen mantra. Having reached 108 repetitions, if he/she wishes to continue another cycle of mantras, the devotee turns the mala around without crossing the head bead and repeats the cycle. Japa-yajna is claimed to be most effective if the mantra is repeated silently in mind (manasah).

According to this school, any shloka from holy Hindu texts like the Vedas, Upanishads, Bhagavad Gita, Yoga Sutra, even the Mahabharata, Ramayana, Durga saptashati or Chandi is a mantra, thus can be part of the japa, repeated to achieve a numinous effect. The Dharmasāstra claims Gāyatri mantra derived from Rig Veda verse 3.62.10, and the Purușasūkta mantra from Rig Veda verse 10.90 are most auspicious mantras for japa at sunrise and sunset; it is claimed to purify the mind and spirit.

Examples

Gayatri

The Gayatri mantra is considered one of the most universal of all Hindu mantras, invoking the universal Brahman as the principle of knowledge and the illumination of the primordial Sun. The mantra is extracted from the 10th verse of Hymn 62 in Book III of the Rig Veda.

ॐ भूर्भुवस्व: |तत्सवितुर्वरेण्यम् |भर्गो देवस्य धीमहि |धियो यो न: प्रचोदयात्

Oṁ bhūr bhuvaḥ svaḥ tat savitur vareṇyaṃ bhargo devasya dhīmahi dhiyo yo naḥ pracodayāt,

"Let us meditate on that excellent glory of the divine Light (Vivifier, Sun). May he stimulate our understandings (knowledge, intellectual illumination)."

Pavamana

   .
( 1.3.28)

"from the unreal lead me to the real, from the dark lead me to the light, from death lead me to immortality."

Shanti

Oṁ Sahanā vavatu
sahanau bhunaktu
Sahavīryam karavāvahai
Tejasvi nāvadhītamastu
Mā vidviṣāvahai
Oṁ Shāntiḥ, Shāntiḥ, Shāntiḥ.

"Om! Let the Studies that we together undertake be effulgent;
Let there be no Animosity amongst us;
Om! Peace, Peace, Peace."
 – Taittiriya Upanishad 2.2.2
 
Other important Hindu mantras include:

 Om Namah Shivaya, one of the main mantras in Shaivism
 Om Namo Narayanaya, the principal mantra of Vaishnavism
 Om Shree Durgayai Namah, one of the principal mantras in Shaktism and Shaivism dedicated to Durga
 Hare Krishna Maha Mantra, the most important mantra in the Bhakti tradition of Chaitanya Mahaprabhu
 Om Namo Bhagavate Vāsudevāya
 Om Aim Hreem Kleem Chamundayai Vichche, one of the main mantras in Shaktism and Shaivism
 Om Shree Ram Jai Ram Jai Jai Ram
 , principal mantra in Shaktism
 Om Sarvamangala Mangalye Shive Sarvartha Sadhike, Sharanye Tryambake Gauri Narayani Namostute from Devi Mahatmya.
 The various mantras associated with the yogic Sūryanamaskāra (Sun Salutation) practice
 So'ham (I am He or I am That)
 Aham Brahma Asmi'''' (I Am Brahman); 
 The various mantras used in Sri Vidya tradition
 Dakshinamurthy Gayatri Mantra;
 Chandi Navakshari Mantra; 
 Santhana GopalaKrishna Mantra; 
 Shoolini Durga Mantra; 
 Maha Sudarshana Mantra; 
 Maha Ganapathi Mantra; Svayamvara Kala Parvati Mantra
 32 Names of Durga (Sanskrit: Durgādvātriḿśatnāmamālā)

In the Shiva Sutras

Apart from Shiva Sutras, which originated from Shiva's tandava dance, the Shiva Sutras of Vasugupta are a collection of seventy-seven aphorisms that form the foundation of the tradition of spiritual mysticism known as Kashmir Shaivism. They are attributed to the sage Vasugupta of the 9th century C.E. Sambhavopaya (1-1 to 1–22), Saktopaya (2-1 to 2–10) and Anavopaya (3-1 to 3–45) are the main sub-divisions, three means of achieving God consciousness, of which the main technique of Saktopaya is a mantra. But "mantra" in this context does not mean incantation or muttering of some sacred formula. The word "mantra" is used here in its etymological signification. That which saves one by pondering over the light of Supreme I-consciousness is a mantra. The divine Supreme I-consciousness is the dynamo of all the mantras. Deha or body has been compared to wood, "mantra" has been compared to arani—a piece of wood used for kindling fire by friction; prana has been compared to fire. Sikha or flame has been compared to atma (Self); ambara or sky has been compared to Shiva. When prana is kindled by means of mantra used as arani, fire in the form of udana arises in susumna, and then just as flame arises out of kindled fire and gets dissolved in the sky, so also atma (Self) like a flame having burnt down the fuel of the body, gets absorbed in Shiva.

Buddhism 

One of the most ancient Buddhist mantras is the famous Pratītyasamutpāda-gāthā, also known as the dependent origination dhāraṇī. This phrase is said to encapsulate the meaning of the Buddha's Teaching. It was a popular Buddhist verse and was used as a mantra. This mantra is found inscribed on numerous ancient Buddhist statues, chaityas, and images.

The Sanskrit version of this mantra is:ye dharmā hetuprabhavā hetuṃ teṣāṃ tathāgato hyavadat, teṣāṃ ca yo nirodha evaṃvādī mahāśramaṇaḥThe phrase can be translated as follows:Of those phenomena which arise from causes: Those causes have been taught by the Tathāgata (Buddha), and their cessation too - thus proclaims the Great Ascetic.

Theravada 
According to the American Buddhist teacher Jack Kornfield:

Mantra practice is often combined with breathing meditation, so that one recites a mantra simultaneously with in-breath and out-breath to help develop tranquility and concentration. Mantra meditation is especially popular among lay people. Like other basic concentration exercises, it can be used simply to the mind, or it can be the basis for an insight practice where the mantra becomes the focus of observation of how life unfolds, or an aid in surrendering and letting go." 

The "Buddho" mantra is widespread in the Thai Forest Tradition and was taught by Ajahn Chah and his students. Another popular mantra in Thai Buddhism is Samma-Araham, referring to the Buddha who has 'perfectly' (samma) attained 'perfection in the Buddhist sense' (araham), used in Dhammakaya meditation.

In the Tantric Theravada tradition of Southeast Asia, mantras are central to their method of meditation. Popular mantras in this tradition include Namo Buddhaya ("Homage to the Buddha") and Araham ("Worthy One"). There are Thai Buddhist amulet katha: that is, mantras to be recited while holding an amulet.

Mahayana Buddhism 

The use of mantras became very popular with the rise of Mahayana Buddhism. Many Mahayana sutras contain mantras, bijamantras, dharanis and other similar phrases which were chanted or used in meditation. One popular bija (seed) mantra in Mahayana Buddhism is the Sanskrit letter A (see A in Buddhism). This seed mantra was equated with Prajñaparamita, emptiness and non-arising (anutpada). This seed mantra remains in use in Shingon, Dzogchen and Rinzai Zen. Mahayana Buddhism also adopted the Om mantra, which is found incorporated into various Mahayana Buddhist mantras (like Om Mani Padme Hum).

Another early and influential Mahayana "mantra" or dharani is the Arapacana alphabet (of non-sanskrit origin, possibly Karosthi) which is used as a contemplative tool in the Long Prajñāpāramitā sutras. The entire alphabet runs: a ra pa ca na la da ba ḍa ṣa va ta ya ṣṭa ka sa ma ga stha ja śva dha śa kha kṣa sta jña rta ha bha cha sma hva tsa bha ṭha ṇa pha ska ysa śca ṭa ḍhaIn this practice, each letter stood for a specific idea (for example, "a" stands for non-arising (anutpada), and pa stands for paramārtha. As such, this practice was also a kind of mnemonic technique (dhāraṇīmukha) which allowed one to remember the key points of the teaching.

The Mahayana sutras introduced various mantras into Mahayana Buddhism, such as:

 Shakyamuni's Mantra: Oṃ muni muni mahāmuni śākyamuni svāhā 
 Heart sutra mantra (Prajñāpāramitāhṛdaya): Gate gate pāragate pārasaṃgate bodhi svāhā
 Mantra of Mañjuśrī: om arapacana dhīḥ
 Prajñaparamita-devi mantra: Nama ārya prajñā pāramitāyāi svāhā (from The Sutra of Mañjuśrī’s Questions) 
 Diamond Sutra mantra (Kumarajiva edition): namo bhagavatīprajñāpāramitāyai oṃ īriti īṣiri śruta viṣaya viṣaya svāhā  
 Medicine Guru mantra (in the Sutra of Medicine Guru): oṃ bhaiṣajye bhaiṣajye mahābhaiṣajya-samudgate svāhā
 Avalokiteshvara's mantra (the Mani mantra): oṃ maṇi padme hūṃ, first appearing in the Kāraṇḍavyūhasūtra (4th-5th century)

East Asian Buddhism

China 
In Chinese Buddhism, various mantras, including the Great Compassion Mantra, the Uṣṇīṣa Vijaya Dhāraṇī from the Uṣṇīṣa Vijaya Dhāraṇī Sutra, the Mahāmāyūrī Vidyārājñī Dhāraṇī, the Heart Sutra and various forms of nianfo are commonly chanted by both monastics and laymen. A major mantra in the Chan Buddhist tradition is the Śūraṅgama Mantra from the Śūraṅgama Sutra, which extensively references Buddhist deities such as the bodhisattvas Manjushri, Mahākāla, Sitatapatra, Vajrapani and the Five Tathagatas, especially Bhaisajyaguru. It is often used for protection or purification, as it is often recited as part of the daily morning session in monasteries. In addition, various Buddhas, Bodhisattvas and deities also have mantras associated with them.

In China and Vietnam, a set of mantras known as the Ten Small Mantras (Chinese: 十小咒; Pinyin: Shíxiǎozhòu) were fixed by the monk Yulin (Chinese: 玉琳國師; Pinyin: Yùlín Guóshī), a teacher of the Shunzhi Emperor, for monks, nuns, and laity to chant during morning liturgical services. They are still chanted in modern Chinese Buddhism.

Chinese Chan Buddhism also makes use of esoteric mantras, a practice which can be traced back to the Tang dynasty. One of these is the Śūraṅgama Mantra, which has been taught by various modern Chan monks, such as Venerable Hsuan Hua. Shaolin temple monks also made use of esoteric mantras and dharani.

Japanese Shingon 

Kūkai (774–835), a noted Buddhist monk, advanced a general theory of language based on his analysis of two forms of Buddhist ritual language: dharani (dhāra.nī) and mantra. Mantra is restricted to esoteric Buddhist practice whereas dharani is found in both esoteric and exoteric ritual. Dharanis for instance are found in the Heart Sutra. The term "shingon" is the Japanese pronunciation of the Chinese transcription of the Sanskrit word "mantra", 真言 (zhēnyán).  Kūkai classified mantra as a special class of dharani and suggested that every syllable of a dharani was a manifestation of the true nature of reality – in Buddhist terms that all sound is a manifestation of shunyata or emptiness of self-nature. Thus rather than being devoid of meaning, Kūkai suggests that dharanis are in fact saturated with meaning – every syllable is symbolic on multiple levels.

One of Kūkai's distinctive contributions was to take this symbolic association even further by saying that there is no essential difference between the syllables of mantras and sacred texts, and those of ordinary language. If one understood the workings of mantra, then any sounds could be a representative of ultimate reality. This emphasis on sounds was one of the drivers for Kūkai's championing of the phonetic writing system, the kana, which was adopted in Japan around the time of Kūkai. He is generally credited with the invention of the kana, but there is apparently some doubt about this story amongst scholars.

This mantra-based theory of language had a powerful effect on Japanese thought and society which up until Kūkai's time had been dominated by imported Chinese culture of thought, particularly in the form of the Classical Chinese language which was used in the court and amongst the literati, and Confucianism which was the dominant political ideology. In particular, Kūkai was able to use this new theory of language to create links between indigenous Japanese culture and Buddhism. For instance, he made a link between the Buddha Mahavairocana and the Shinto sun Goddess Amaterasu. Since the emperors were thought to be descended form Amaterasu, Kūkai had found a powerful connection here that linked the emperors with the Buddha, and also in finding a way to integrate Shinto with Buddhism, something that had not happened with Confucianism. Buddhism then became essentially an indigenous religion in a way that Confucianism had not. And it was through language and mantra that this connection was made. Kūkai helped to elucidate what mantra is in a way that had not been done before: he addresses the fundamental questions of what a text is, how signs function, and above all, what language is. In this, he covers some of the same ground as modern day Structuralists and others scholars of language, although he comes to very different conclusions.

In this system of thought, all sounds are said to originate from "a". For esoteric Buddhism "a" has a special function because it is associated with Shunyata or the idea that no thing exists in its own right, but is contingent upon causes and conditions. (See Dependent origination) In Sanskrit "a" is a prefix which changes the meaning of a word into its opposite, so "vidya" is understanding, and "avidya" is ignorance (the same arrangement is also found in many Greek words, like e.g. "atheism" vs. "theism" and "apathy" vs. "pathos"). The letter a is both visualised in the Siddham script and pronounced in rituals and meditation practices. In the Mahavairocana Sutra which is central to Shingon Buddhism it says: "Thanks to the original vows of the Buddhas and Bodhisattvas, a miraculous force resides in the mantras, so that by pronouncing them one acquires merit without limits". [in Conze, p. 183]

A mantra is Kuji-kiri in Shingon as well as in Shugendo. The practice of writing mantras, and copying texts as a spiritual practice, became very refined in Japan, and some of these are written in the Japanese script and Siddham script of Sanskrit, recited in either language.

Main Shingon Mantras 

There are thirteen mantras used in Shingon Buddhism, each dedicated to a major deity (the "thirteen Buddhas" - jūsanbutsu - of Shingon). The mantras are drawn from the Vairocanābhisaṃbodhi Sūtra. The mantra for each deity name in Japanese, its equivalent name in Sanskrit, the Sanskrit mantra, and the Japanese version in the Shingon tradition are as follows:
 Fudōmyōō (Acala): Sanskrit: namaḥ samanta vajrāṇāṃ caṇḍa mahāroṣaṇa sphoṭaya hūṃ traṭ hāṃ māṃ (Shingon transliteration: nōmaku samanda bazaratan senda makaroshada sowataya untarata kanman)
 Shaka nyorai (Sakyamuni): namaḥ samanta buddhānāṃ bhaḥ (nōmaku sanmanda bodanan baku)
 Monju bosatsu (Manjushri):  oṃ a ra pa ca na (on arahashanō)
 Fugen bosatsu (Samantabhadra): oṃ samayas tvaṃ (on sanmaya satoban)
 Jizō bosatsu (Ksitigarbha): oṃ ha ha ha vismaye svāhā (on kakaka bisanmaei sowaka)
 Miroku bosatsu (Maitreya): ṃ maitreya svāhā( on maitareiya sowaka)
 Yakushi nyorai (Bhaisajyaguru): oṃ huru huru caṇḍāli mātangi svāhā (on korokoro sendari matōgi sowaka)
 Kanzeon bosatsu (Avalokitesvara): oṃ ārolik svāhā (on arorikya sowaka)
 Seishi bosatsu (Mahasthamaprapta): oṃ saṃ jaṃ jaṃ saḥ svāhā (on san zan saku sowaka)
 Amida nyorai (Amitabha): oṃ amṛta teje hara hūṃ (on amirita teisei kara un)
 Ashuku nyorai (Akshobhya): oṃ akṣobhya hūṃ (on akishubiya un)
 Dainichi nyorai (Vairocana): oṃ a vi ra hūṃ khaṃ vajradhātu vaṃ (on abiraunken basara datoban)
 Kokūzō bosatsu (Akashagarbha): namo ākāśagarbhāya oṃ ārya kāmāri mauli svāhā (nōbō akyashakyarabaya on arikya mari bori sowaka)

Other Japanese Buddhist traditions 
Mantras are also an important element of other Japanese Buddhist traditions. The Tendai school includes extensive repertoire of Esoteric Buddhist practices, which include the use of mantras. 

Nichiren Buddhist practice focuses on the chanting of one single mantra or phrase: Nam Myōhō Renge Kyō (南無妙法蓮華経, which means "Homage to the Lotus Sutra").

Japanese Zen also makes use of mantras. One example is the Mantra of Light (kōmyō shingon), which is common in Japanese Soto Zen and was derived from the Shingon sect. The use of esoteric practices (such as mantra) within Zen is sometimes termed "mixed Zen" (kenshū zen 兼修禪). Keizan Jōkin (1264–1325) is seen as a key figure that introduced this practice into the Soto school. A common mantra used in Soto Zen is the Śūraṅgama mantra (Ryōgon shu 楞嚴呪; T. 944A).

In Northern Vajrayana Buddhism 
Mantrayana (Sanskrit), which may be translated as "way of the mantra", was the original self-identifying name of those that have come to be determined 'Nyingmapa'. The Nyingmapa which may be rendered as "those of the ancient way", a name constructed due to the genesis of the Sarma "fresh", "new" traditions. Mantrayana has developed into a synonym of Vajrayana.

Noted translator of Buddhist texts Edward Conze (1904–1979) distinguishes three periods in the Buddhist use of mantra.

Initially, according to Conze, like their fellow Indians, Buddhists used mantra as protective spells to ward off malign influences. Despite a Vinaya rule which forbids monks engaging in the Brahminical practice of chanting mantras for material gain, there is a number of protective mantras for a group of ascetic monks. However, even at this early stage, there is perhaps something more than animistic magic at work. Particularly in the case of the Ratana Sutta the efficacy of the verses seems to be related to the concept of "truth". Each verse of the sutta ends with "by the virtue of this truth may there be happiness".

Conze notes that later mantras were used more to guard the spiritual life of the chanter, and sections on mantras began to be included in some Mahayana sutras such as the White Lotus Sutra, and the Lankavatara Sutra. The scope of protection also changed in this time. In the Sutra of Golden Light the Four Great Kings promise to exercise sovereignty over the different classes of demigods, to protect the whole of Jambudvipa (the Indian subcontinent), to protect monks who proclaim the sutra, and to protect kings who patronise the monks who proclaim the sutra. The apotheosis of this type of approach is the Nichiren school of Buddhism that was founded in the 13th century Japan, and which distilled many previously complex Buddhist practices down to the veneration of the Lotus Sutra through a recitation of the daimoku: "Nam myoho renge kyo" which translates as "Homage to the Lotus Sutra".

The third period began, according to Conze, in about the 7th century, to take center stage and become a vehicle for salvation in their own right. Tantra started to gain momentum in the 6th and 7th century, with specifically Buddhist forms appearing as early as 300CE. Mantrayana was an early name for what is now more commonly known as Vajrayana, which gives us a hint as to the place of mantra in Indo-Tibetan Buddhism. The aim of Vajrayana practice is to give the practitioner a direct experience of reality, of things as they really are. Mantras function as symbols of that reality, and different mantras are different aspects of that reality – for example wisdom or compassion. Mantras are often associated with a particular deity, one famous exception being the Prajnaparamita mantra associated with the Heart Sutra. One of the key Vajrayana strategies for bringing about a direct experience of reality is to engage the entire psycho-physical organism in the practices. In one Buddhist analysis, the person consists of 'body, speech and mind' (refer: Three Vajra). So a typical sadhana or meditation practice might include mudras, or symbolic hand gestures; the recitations of mantras; as well as the visualisation of celestial beings and visualising the letters of the mantra which is being recited. Clearly here mantra is associated with speech. The meditator may visualise the letters in front of themselves, or within their body. They may be pronounced out loud, or internally in mind only.

Om mani padme hum 

Probably the most famous mantra of Buddhism is Om mani padme hum, the six syllable mantra of the Bodhisattva of compassion Avalokiteśvara (Tibetan: Chenrezig, Chinese: Guanyin). This mantra is particularly associated with the four-armed Shadakshari form of Avalokiteśvara. The Dalai Lama is said to be an incarnation of Avalokiteshvara, and so the mantra is especially revered by his devotees.

The book Foundations of Tibetan Mysticism by Lama Anagarika Govinda, gives a classic example of how such a mantra can contain many levels of symbolic meaning.

Other 
The following list of mantras is from Kailash: A Journal of Himalayan Studies, Volume 1, Number 2, 1973. (pp. 168–169) (augmented by other contributors). The mantras used in Tibetan Buddhist practice are in Sanskrit, to preserve the original mantras. Visualizations and other practices are usually done in the Tibetan language.

Om vagishvara hum This is the mantra of the Mahabodhisattva Manjusri, Tibetan: Jampelyang (Wylie "'jam dpal dbyangs")... The Buddha in his wisdom aspect.
Om vajrasattva hum The short mantra for White Vajrasattva, there is also a full 100-syllable mantra for Vajrasattva.
Om vajrapani namo hum The mantra of the Buddha as Protector of the Secret Teachings. i.e.: as the Mahabodhisattva Channa Dorje (Vajrapani).
Om ah hum vajra guru padma siddhi hum The mantra of the Vajraguru Guru Padma Sambhava who established Mahayana Buddhism and Tantra in Tibet.
Om tare tuttare ture mama ayurjnana punye pushting svaha The mantra of Dölkar or White Tara, the emanation of Arya Tara [Chittamani Tara]. Variants: Om tare tuttare ture mama ayurjnana punye pushting kuru swaha (Drikung Kagyu), Om tare tuttare ture mama ayu punye jnana puktrim kuru soha (Karma Kagyu).

Om tare tuttare ture svaha, mantra of Green Arya Tara—Jetsun Dolma or Tara, the Mother of the Buddhas: om represents Tara's sacred body, speech, and mind. Tare means liberating from all discontent. Tutare means liberating from the eight fears, the external dangers, but mainly from the internal dangers, the delusions. Ture means liberating from duality; it shows the "true" cessation of confusion. Soha means "may the meaning of the mantra take root in my mind."

According to Tibetan Buddhism, this mantra (Om tare tutare ture soha) can not only eliminate disease, troubles, disasters, and karma, but will also bring believers blessings, longer life, and even the wisdom to transcend one's circle of reincarnation.
Tara representing long life and health.
Oṃ amaraṇi jīvantaye svāhā (Tibetan version: oṃ ā ma ra ṇi dzi wan te ye svā hā) The mantra of the Buddha of limitless life: the Buddha Amitayus (Tibetan Tsépagmed) in celestial form.
Om dhrung svaha The purification mantra of the mother Namgyalma.
Om ami dhewa hri The mantra of the Buddha Amitabha (Hopagmed) of the Western Pureland, his skin the color of the setting sun.
Om ami dewa hri The mantra of Amitabha (Ompagme in Tibetan).
Om ah ra pa ca na dhih The mantra of the "sweet-voiced one", Jampelyang (Wylie "'jam dpal dbyangs") or Manjusri, the Bodhisattva of wisdom.
Om muni muni maha muniye sakyamuni swaha The mantra of Buddha Sakyamuni, the historical Buddha
Om gate gate paragate parasamgate bodhi svaha The mantra of the Heart of the Perfection of Wisdom Sutra (Heart Sutra)
Namo bhagavate Bhaishajya-guru vaidurya-praba-rajaya tathagataya arhate samyak-sambuddhaya tadyata *Tadyata OM bhaishajye bhaishajye maha bhaishajya raja-samudgate svaha The mantra of the 'Medicine Buddha', Bhaiṣajya-guru (or Bhaishajyaguru), from Chinese translations of the Master of Healing Sutra.

In Bon 
There are also numerous mantras in the Bön religion such as Om Ma Tri Mu Ye Sa Le Du.

Zoroastrianism 

In Zoroastrianism, the use of mantras goes back to Zarathustra himself, who describes his role as a prophet of Ahura Mazda explicitly as a knower of mantras. In the Zoroastrian tradition, a mantra is usually a shorter inspired utterance that accompanies religious rituals. They differ from the longer, often eight-syllable praise songs (called Yasht in the Avesta) as well as the often eleven-syllable songs (called Gathas in the Avesta as well as in the Vedas). The four most important Zoroastrian mantras are the Ahuna Vairya, the Ashem Vohu, the Yenghe hatam, and the Airyaman ishya. 

Both Vedic and Avestan mantras have a number of functional similarities. One of these is the idea that truth, when properly expressed in the mantra, can compel a deity to grant the speaker's request(compare Sacca-kiriya). Another similarity is the Vedic and Avestic association of mantras with paths, so that a properly formulated mantra can open a path to the deity addressed. Because of the etymological and conceptual similarity, such religious utterances must therefore have already been known during the common Indo-Iranian period, when the people of the Avesta and of the Vedas formed a single people. They are, therefore, not derived from the Vedic tradition, but represent an independent development of ancient Iran, corresponding to that in ancient India. The study of their commonalities is therefore important for understanding the poetic and religious traditions of the early Indo-Iranians.

Jainism 
The concept of mantras in Jainism mainly deals with seeking forgiveness, praising Arihants, or Pañca-Parameṣṭhi  Yet some mantras are claimed to enhance intellect, prosperity, wealth or fame. There are many mantras in Jainism; most of them are in Sanskrit or Prakrit, but in the last few centuries, some have been composed in Hindi or Gujrati languages. Mantras, couplets, are either chanted or sung, either aloud or by merely moving lips or in silence by thought.

Namokar
Some examples of Jain mantras are Bhaktamara Stotra, Uvasagharam Stotra and [[Rishi Mandal Mantra. The greatest is the Namokar or Navkar Mantra. Acharya Sushil Kumar, a self-realized master of the secrets of the Mantra, wrote in 1987: "There is a deep, secret science to the combination of sounds. Specific syllables are seeds for the awakening of latent powers. Only a person who has been initiated into the vibrational realms, who has actually experienced this level of reality, can fully understand the Science of Letters...the Nomokar Mantra is a treasured gift to humanity of unestimable (sic) worth for the purification, upliftment and spiritual evolution of everyone.".  His book, The Song of the Soul, is a practical manual to unlock the secrets of the mantra.  "Chanting with Guruji" is a compilation of well-known Jain mantras, including the Rishi Mandal Mantra.

The Navkar Mantra (literally, "Nine Line Mantra") is the central mantra of Jainism. "It is the essence of the gospel of the Tirthankars."
The initial 5 lines consist of salutations to various purified souls, and the latter 4 lines are explanatory in nature, highlighting the benefits and greatness of this mantra.

Universal compassion
Pratikraman also contains the following prayer:

Forgiveness
Forgiveness is one of the main virtues Jains cultivate. Kṣamāpanā, or supreme forgiveness, forms part of one of the ten characteristics of dharma. In the pratikramana prayer, Jains repeatedly seek forgiveness from various creatures—even from ekindriyas or single sensed beings like plants and microorganisms that they may have harmed while eating and doing routine activities. Forgiveness is asked by uttering the phrase, Micchāmi dukkaḍaṃ. Micchāmi dukkaḍaṃ is a Prakrit phrase literally meaning "may all the evil that has been done be fruitless."

In their daily prayers and samayika, Jains recite the following Iryavahi sutra in Prakrit, seeking forgiveness from literally all creatures while involved in routine activities:
May you, O Revered One, voluntarily permit me. I would like to confess my sinful acts committed while walking. I honour your permission. I desire to absolve myself of the sinful acts by confessing them. I seek forgiveness from all those living beings which I may have tortured while walking, coming and going, treading on a living organism, seeds, green grass, dew drops, ant hills, moss, live water, live earth, spider web and others. I seek forgiveness from all these living beings, be they one sensed, two sensed, three sensed, four sensed or five sensed, which I may have kicked, covered with dust, rubbed with earth, collided with other, turned upside down, tormented, frightened, shifted from one place to another or killed and deprived them of their lives. (By confessing) may I be absolved of all these sins.

Sikhism
In the Sikh religion, a mantar or mantra is a Shabad (Word or hymn) from the Adi Granth to concentrate the mind on God. Through repetition of the mantra, and listening to one's own voice, thoughts are reduced and the mind rises above materialism to tune into the voice of God.

Mantras in Sikhism are fundamentally different from the secret mantras used in other religions. Unlike in other religions, Sikh mantras are open for anyone to use. They are used openly and are not taught in secret sessions but are used in front of assemblies of Sikhs.

The Mool Mantar, the first composition of Guru Nanak, is the second most widely known Sikh mantra.

The most widely known mantra in the Sikh faith is "Wahe Guru." According to the Sikh poet Bhai Gurdas, the word "Wahe Guru" is the Gurmantra, or the mantra given by the Guru, and eliminates ego.

According to the 10th Sikh Master, Guru Gobind Singh, the "Wahe Guru" mantra was given by God to the Order of the Khalsa, and reforms the apostate into the purified.

Chinese religions 
The influence of Chinese Esoteric Buddhism during the Six Dynasties period and the Tang led to the widespread use of Buddhist esoteric practices in other Chinese religions such as Taoism. This included the use of mantras. Mantras are often still used in Chinese Taoism, such as the words in Dàfàn yǐnyǔ wúliàng yīn (大梵隱語無量音), the recitation of a deity's name. Another example of a Taoist mantra is found in one of the most popular liturgies in Taoism (dating from the Tang dynasty), the Pei-tou yen-sheng ching (The North Star Scripture of Longevity), which contains a long mantra called the "North Star Mantra." The text claims that this mantra "can deliver you from disaster," "ward off evil and give you prosperity and longevity," "help you accumulate good deeds" and give you peace of mind.

The Indian syllable om (唵) is also used in Taoist esotericism. After the arrival of Buddhism many Taoist sects started to use Sanskrit syllables in their mantras or talisman as a way to enhance one's spiritual power aside from the traditional Han incantations. One example of this is the "heart mantra" of Pu Hua Tian Zun (普化天尊), a Taoist deity manifested from the first thunder and head of the “36 thunder gods” in orthodox religious Taoism. His mantra is "Ǎn hōng zhā lì sà mó luō - 唵吽吒唎薩嚩囉". Taoist believe this incantation to be the heart mantra of Pu Hua Tian Zun which will protect them from bad qi and calm down emotions. Taoist mantra recitation may also be practiced along with extensive visualization exercises.

There are also mantras in Cheondoism, Daesun Jinrihoe, Jeung San Do and Onmyōdō.

Other Chinese religions have also adopted the use of mantras. These include:
Námó Tiānyuán Tàibǎo Āmítuófó (南無天元太保阿彌陀佛) The mantra of Xiantiandao and Shengdao in Chinese.
Wútàifó Mílè (無太佛彌勒) The mantra of Yiguandao in Chinese.
Guānshìyīn Púsà (觀世音菩薩) The mantra of the Li-ism in Chinese.
Zhēnkōng jiāxiàng, wúshēng fùmǔ (真空家鄉，無生父母) The mantra of the Luojiao in Chinese.
Zhōng Shù Lián Míng Dé, Zhèng Yì Xìn Rěn Gōng, Bó Xiào Rén Cí Jiào, Jié Jiǎn Zhēn Lǐ Hé (忠恕廉明德，正義信忍公，博孝仁慈覺，節儉真禮和) The mantra of the Tiender and the Lord of Universe Church in Chinese.
Qīngjìng Guāngmíng Dàlì Zhìhuì Wúshàng Zhìzhēn Móní Guāngfó (清淨光明大力智慧無上至真摩尼光佛) The mantra of the Manichaeism in Chinese.

See also

 Buddhist chant
 Jesus Prayer
 Khadgamala
 Kirtan
 Kotodama
 Kuji-in
 Pranava yoga
 Prayer beads
 Sandhyavandanam
 Dhikr

Notes

References

)

Gelongma Karma Khechong Palmo. Mantras on the Prayer Flag. Kailash: A Journal of Himalayan Studies, Volume 1, Number 2, 1973. (pp. 168–169).

The Rider Encyclopedia of Eastern Philosophy and religion. (London : Rider, 1986).

Durgananda, Swami. Meditation Revolution. (Agama Press, 1997). 

)

External links

Mantras
Buddhist chants
Hindu philosophical concepts
Indian poetics
Meditation
Puja (Hinduism)
Spiritual practice
Religious formulas